Henri Bourassa Boulevard (officially in ) is a major east–west street located in Montreal, Quebec, Canada. Located in the north of the island of Montreal, it runs parallel to Gouin Boulevard. Spanning 29 kilometres (18 miles) in length, it links the borough of Rivière-des-Prairies–Pointe-aux-Trembles in the east to a junction with Autoroute 13 and Alfred Nobel Boulevard in Saint-Laurent in the west. West of here, the street continues into the West Island as Hymus Boulevard, a main thoroughfare in Dorval, Pointe-Claire, and Kirkland.

History 
The street is renamed after Henri Bourassa (1868–1952), a Quebec nationalist politician, and founder of the Montreal newspaper Le Devoir. It was enlarged in steps beginning in 1954, following expropriations, but also has a new segment.

Part of what became the boulevard — two segments between Meilleur Street and Lajeunesse — was originally named Kelly Street by the Irish farmers who lived alongside it.

Further east, the boulevard was built on what was a private right-of-way owned and operated as a tramway line by the Montreal Park and Island Railway Company, a predecessor of today's Montreal Transit Corporation.  Further west, the boulevard was built from Bois Franc Road.

Henri-Bourassa metro station, Du Ruisseau stationon the Réseau express métropolitain and Bois-de-Boulogne train station are located on Henri Bourassa Boulevard.

References 

Streets in Montreal
Saint-Laurent, Quebec
Ahuntsic-Cartierville
Montréal-Nord
Category
Boulevards